Jewfish Point is a cape in Los Angeles County, in the U.S. state of California. It is located on the Southeast coast of Santa Catalina Island.

The cape was named for a type of fish (grouper, formerly known as "jew fish") prized for its taste.

References

Headlands of California
Landforms of Los Angeles County, California